Eden House College was an independent college established in London in 1968. It offered language and computing courses as well as ABE programmes. It was accredited by the British Council in 2005.

Eden House College went into administration and closed down on Tuesday 4 October 2011.

Eden House taught both long term and short term English language courses to international students, offering courses such as IELTS and English Cambridge Examination Courses to prepare students for official examinations. It was recognised by the British Computer Society as an approved Test Centre, Eden House offered computing courses which led to recognised qualifications such as the European Computer Driver Licence: both Standard and Advanced (ECDL). In addition to this Eden House was also accredited by the Association of Business Executives and offered ABE courses. 
 
Eden House College was fully licensed to sponsor students’ under the Tier 4 Points Based System and appeared on the Register of Sponsors as an ‘A’ rated sponsor. Eden House College was also a member of English UK.

References

External links
 Eden House College

Language schools in the United Kingdom
Defunct universities and colleges in London